Adiba Anjum Mita is a Bangladeshi politician who is elected as Member of 11th Jatiya Sangsad of Reserved Seats for Women. She is a politician of Bangladesh Awami League.

References

Awami League politicians
People from Rajshahi District
11th Jatiya Sangsad members
Women members of the Jatiya Sangsad
Year of birth missing (living people)
Living people
21st-century Bangladeshi women politicians